Nadezhda Geneleva (born 14 April 1997) is a Kazakhstani professional racing cyclist who rides for Astana Women's Team.

Major results
2015
3rd Points Race, Track Clubs ACC Cup
2016
Track Clubs ACC Cup
2nd Omnium
2nd Team Pursuit (with Faina Potapova, Tatyana Geneleva and Yekaterina Yuraitis)
3rd Points Race
2nd Team Pursuit, Track Asia Cup (with Rinata Akhmetcha, Zhanerke Sanakbayeva and Yekaterina Yuraitis)

See also
 List of 2016 UCI Women's Teams and riders

References

External links
 

1997 births
Living people
Kazakhstani female cyclists
Place of birth missing (living people)
20th-century Kazakhstani women
21st-century Kazakhstani women